Aram Hakobyan (born 15 August 1979) is an Armenian football coach and a former striker.

Club career
Aram was a top scorer in the Armenian Premier League 2006 season, scoring with 25 goals. He was also voted the best player of the 2005 season.

International career
Aram played for the Armenia national football team. He participated in 16 international matches and scored one goal following his debut in an away friendly match against Moldova on 2 February 2000.

References

External links

1979 births
Living people
Footballers from Yerevan
Armenian footballers
Armenia international footballers
Armenian expatriate footballers
FC Urartu players
Expatriate footballers in Ukraine
Armenian expatriate sportspeople in Ukraine
Expatriate footballers in Russia
FC Mariupol players
Ulisses FC players
FC Impuls Dilijan players
Armenian Premier League players
Ukrainian Premier League players
Association football forwards
FC Volga Ulyanovsk players
Armenian football managers
Armenian Premier League managers